1856 election may refer to:
Chilean presidential election, 1856
1856 United States presidential election
United States House of Representatives elections, 1856